Luca Profeta (born 22 February 1990) is an Italian footballer who plays as a defender for Prima Divisione club Pergocrema.

Club career
Born in Milan, Lombardy, Profeta spent his youth career at Internazionale, at first as a midfielder. He played from Giovanissimi Regionali B Team to Allievi Nazionali Team (2006–07 season). In January 2008, he was loaned to Pro Sesto along with Fabio Perissinotto, rejoining Inter team-mate Andrea Bavena, Cristiano Biraghi, Samuele Beretta, Marco Buonanno, Nicolò De Cesare, Mattia Dell'Aera, Domenico Maiese, Marco Puntoriere and Davide Tremolada. He then spent 2 seasons with Serie D club Colognese. In 2009–10 season he played 27 times.

In August 2010, he was signed by Prima Divisione club Pergocrema. He played once for the club at 2010–11 Coppa Italia Lega Pro, against Renate.

International career
Profeta only played for Italy at U-16 level. Profeta received his first call-up to 2005 Torneo Giovanile di Natale In December 2005. He finished as a runner-up in a youth tournament held in Montaigu, Vendée, France. He played 3 out of possible 4 matches, only missed the round 2 and started twice in round 1 and 3.

Honours
Pro Sesto youth
 Campionato Nazionale Dante Berretti: 2008

References

External links
 FIGC 
 LaSerieD.com Profile 

Italian footballers
Inter Milan players
S.S.D. Pro Sesto players
U.S. Pergolettese 1932 players
Association football fullbacks
Footballers from Milan
1990 births
Living people